Charles Cornwallis, 1st Earl Cornwallis  (29 March 170023 June 1762), styled The Honourable Charles Cornwallis until 1722 and known as The Lord Cornwallis between 1722 and 1753, was a British peer.

Background
Cornwallis was the son of Charles Cornwallis, 4th Baron Cornwallis, by Lady Charlotte, daughter of Richard Butler, 1st Earl of Arran. Edward Cornwallis and Frederick Cornwallis were his younger brothers. He was admitted to Clare College, Cambridge in 1717.

Career
Cornwallis succeeded his father in the barony in 1722. In 1740 he was sworn of the Privy Council and appointed Lord-Lieutenant of the Tower Hamlets and Constable of the Tower of London, posts he held until 1762. In 1753 he was created Viscount Brome, in the County of Suffolk, and Earl Cornwallis.

Family
Lord Cornwallis married the Honourable Elizabeth, daughter of Charles Townshend, 2nd Viscount Townshend, in 1722.
They had seven children:
 Lady Mary Cornwallis (6 June 1736 - 28 December 1770), married on 13 August 1769 Samuel Whitbread and had issue.
 Gen. Charles Cornwallis, 1st Marquess Cornwallis
 Capt. Hon. Henry Cornwallis (10 September 1740 – 1761)
 Bishop James Cornwallis, 4th Earl Cornwallis
 Adm. Sir William Cornwallis, RN (1744–1819)
 Lady Elizabeth Cornwallis (d. 20 March 1796), married Bowen Southwell in July 1753
 Lady Charlotte Cornwallis (d. 11 March 1794), married 8 April 1756 Bishop Spencer Madan and had issue.

He died in June 1762, aged 62, and was succeeded by his eldest son, Charles, who became a prominent military commander and was created Marquess Cornwallis in 1792. The Countess Cornwallis died on 17 December 1785. 

He was the grandson of Charles Cornwallis, 3rd Baron Cornwallis; the great-grandson of Charles Cornwallis, 2nd Baron Cornwallis; and the great-great-grandson of Frederick Cornwallis, 1st Baron Cornwallis.

He was the grandfather of Charles Cornwallis; the great-grandfather of James Mann; the 2nd great-grandfather of Fiennes Cornwallis; the 3rd great-grandfather of Fiennes Cornwallis, 1st Baron Cornwallis; the 4th great-grandfather of Wykeham Cornwallis, 2nd Baron Cornwallis; and the 5th great-grandfather of Fiennes Cornwallis, 3rd Baron Cornwallis.

References

|-

1700 births
1762 deaths
Earls in the Peerage of Great Britain
Members of the Privy Council of Great Britain
Lord-Lieutenants of the Tower Hamlets
Charles
Constables of the Tower of London
Freemasons of the Premier Grand Lodge of England
Barons Cornwallis